Grecale was one of four s built for the  (Royal Italian Navy) in the early 1930s. Completed in 1934, she served in World War II. She survived the war and continued her service with  until 1964.

Design and description
The Maestrale-class destroyers were a completely new design intended to rectify the stability problems of the preceding . Their complement during wartime was 190 officers and enlisted men.

The Maestrales were powered by two Parsons geared steam turbines, each driving one propeller shaft using steam supplied by 3 three-drum boilers.

Their main battery consisted of four  guns in two twin-gun turrets, one each fore and aft of the superstructure. Amidships were a pair of 15-caliber 120-millimeter star shell guns. Anti-aircraft (AA) defense for the Maestrale-class ships was provided by four  machine guns. They were equipped with six  torpedo tubes in two triple mounts amidships. Although the ships were not provided with a sonar system for anti-submarine work, they were fitted with a pair of depth charge throwers. The Maestrales could carry 56 mines.

During World War II, Grecales 40 mm guns and 13.2 mm machine guns were replaced with eight  cannon, the addition of another pair of depth charge throwers, and the replacement of aft torpedo tubes and midships rangefinder with two single  cannon. In 1949, her bridge was rebuild and its design resembled British destroyers bridge. She also fitted with a lattice mast, new radars, and her light anti-aircraft guns now consisted of three 37 mm/54 guns. In 1952–1953, her 37 mm guns were replaced with six Bofors  guns and the remaining torpedo tubes were removed. Grecale was converted into command ship in 1959–1960 and all of her armaments, saved for two Bofors 40 mm guns, were removed.

Citations

Bibliography

External links

 Grecale Marina Militare website

Maestrale-class destroyers
1934 ships
World War II destroyers of Italy
Frigates of the Italian Navy